Hibiscus diversifolius, the swamp hibiscus, is a widespread species of hibiscus. It grows to between 1 and 2 metres in height, with prickly stems and yellow flowers with a maroon basal spot during spring summer.

Distribution
It occurs in tropical Africa, New Guinea, the Philippines, many Pacific Islands, Central and South America, the Galapagos Islands, New Zealand, Norfolk Island as well as the states of New South Wales and Queensland in Australia. There is disagreement over its native range. Some sources consider it native only to Africa, and naturalised elsewhere;  but it is considered a native in New Zealand and Australia

It is found in low, swampy areas; in Africa it may occur inland or near the coast, but in all other continents it occurs only in coastal areas. This distribution, together with genomic evidence, suggests that it originated in Africa, and colonised the other continents through long-range salt-water dispersal.

References

External links

diversifolius
Flora of Africa
Flora of Central America
Flora of the Galápagos Islands
Flora of New South Wales
Flora of the North Island
Flora of New Guinea
Flora of Norfolk Island
Flora of the Philippines
Flora of Queensland
Flora of South America
Malvales of Australia
Taxa named by Nikolaus Joseph von Jacquin